Romain Haghedooren (born 28 September 1986) is a retired Belgian professional footballer who last played for Deerlijk as a defender.

In 2005, Haghedooren was given the chance to play in the first team of Mouscron, at the highest level of Belgian football, but his real breakthrough came in the following season, playing a decent 16 matches. Still, Mouscron decided to loan out Haghedooren for one season to second division team OH Leuven. Haghedooren returned to Mouscron for the 2008-09 season, after which his contract ended and he was allowed to leave as a free player. Thereafter, he moved to the second division again, playing for Tournai, Brussels and Roeselare.

References

1986 births
Living people
Belgian footballers
Belgian Pro League players
Challenger Pro League players
Royal Excel Mouscron players
Oud-Heverlee Leuven players
R.F.C. Tournai players
R.W.D.M. Brussels F.C. players
K.S.V. Roeselare players
Sint-Eloois-Winkel Sport players
Association football defenders
People from Menen
Footballers from West Flanders